Turlough O'Carolan (167025 March 1738) was a blind Celtic harper, composer and singer in Ireland whose great fame is due to his gift for melodic composition.

Although not a composer in the classical sense, Carolan is considered by many to be Ireland's national composer. Harpers in the old Irish tradition were still living as late as 1792, and ten, including Arthur O'Neill, Patrick Quin and Donnchadh Ó hÁmsaigh, attended the Belfast Harp Festival. Ó hÁmsaigh played some of Carolan's music, but disliked it for being too modern. Some of Carolan's own compositions show influences of the style of continental classical music, whereas others such as Farewell to Music reflect a much older style of "Gaelic Harping".

Biography

Carolan was born in 1670 in Nobber, County Meath, where his father was a blacksmith. The family, who were said to be a branch of the Mac Brádaigh sept of County Cavan- Carolan's great-grandfather, Shane Grana O'Carrolan, was chieftain of his sept in 1607- forfeited their estates during the civil wars, and moved from Meath in 1684 to Ballyfarnon, County Roscommon, on the invitation of the family of MacDermot Roe of Alderford House. In Roscommon, his father took a job with the MacDermott Roe family. Mrs. MacDermott Roe gave Turlough an education, and he showed talent in poetry. After being blinded by smallpox at the age of eighteen, Carolan was apprenticed by Mrs. MacDermott Roe to a good harper. At the age of twenty-one, being given a horse and a guide, he set out to travel Ireland and compose songs for patrons.

For almost fifty years, Carolan journeyed from one end of Ireland to the other, composing and performing his tunes. One of his earliest compositions was about Brigid Cruise, with whom he was infatuated. Brigid was the teenage daughter of the schoolmaster at the school for the blind attended by Carolan in Cruisetown, Ireland. In 1720, Carolan married Mary Maguire. He was then 50 years of age. Their first family home was a cottage on a parcel of land near the town of Manachain (now Mohill) in County Leitrim, where they settled. They had seven children, six daughters and one son. In 1733 Mary died.

Turlough O'Carolan died on 25 March 1738. He is buried in the MacDermott Roe family crypt in Kilronan Burial Ground near Ballyfarnon, County Roscommon. The annual O'Carolan Harp Festival and Summer School commemorates his life and work in Keadue, County Roscommon.

A bronze monument by sculptor Oisin Kelly depicting Turlough O'Carolan playing his harp was erected on a plinth at the Market Square, Mohill, on 10 August 1986, and was unveiled by Patrick Hillery, President of Ireland.

A statue was erected to him in 2002 at his place of birth, during the Annual O'Carolan Harp Festival, the first of which was held in Nobber in 1988.

Music and style
Carolan composed both songs and instrumental harp music, reflecting various styles of composition. About a third of Carolan's surviving music has associated Irish lyrics that survive to this day. Largely these lyrics are unknown to the musicians of today, who have for the most part adapted Carolan's repertoire to the currently popular Irish fare of jigs and reels.

Modern Irish was the majority language in Ireland during Carolan's time. As Carolan did not speak English very well, he composed only one song in English, "Carolan's Devotion". These lyrics can be heard on the album "Carolan's Harp", by The Harp Consort, 1996. Most of Carolan's songs were dedicated to and written about specific individual patrons. Many of his tunes are widely performed and appreciated today, and a handful of the songs with known lyrics have been recorded by singers. Among these are Gráinne Yeats (Belfast Harp Festival, 1992) and the singers of Garlic Bread ("O'Carolan's Dream", 2007) and Ensemble Musica Humana ("Turlough O'Carolan: a Life in Song", 2013).

Carolan's activities during his career are only partially documented historically. This has led to a lack of accurate information about Carolan and his music, even among Irish musicians. Sometimes, alternate titles or incorrect titles have been applied to songs, creating confusion as to whether the song is Carolan's or someone else's. Also, some of those who have written about Carolan and his music have made up facts or repeated unfounded stories. For instance, Edward Bunting, who began the work of collecting Carolan's pieces, referred to a "very ancient air" the Fairy Queen, saying it "seems to have been the original of Carolan's Fairy Queen." He also reported that "the Fairy Queen of Carolan was not intended by him for words, but as a piece of music for the harp." While it is true that Carolan did not write the traditional Fairy Queen words, which indeed do exist, the words are not ancient (nor is the entirely different traditional Irish air The Fairy Queen), and the words do in fact fit perfectly the original music which Carolan composed for them.

Carolan is said to have typically composed the tune first, as he rode from place to place, then added words later. Many of his songs are designated as "planxties", an obscure word that Carolan apparently invented or popularized to signify a tribute to a merry host. In return for writing songs in honour of wealthy patrons, Carolan was often welcomed as an honoured guest to stay on their estates. It is said that weddings and funerals were sometimes delayed until he could arrive to perform.

Publication
Most of Carolan's compositions were not published or even written down in his lifetime. They survived in the repertoires of fiddlers, pipers, and the last of the old Irish harper/singers. They were collected and published during the late 18th century and beyond, largely beginning with the work of Edward Bunting and his assistants in 1792.

A small sampling of Carolan's music was published during his lifetime. One of the first such publications was in Neale's A Collection of the Most Celebrated Irish Tunes ..., Dublin, 1724.

The definitive work containing all 214 of Carolan's tunes as identified by Donal O'Sullivan (1893–1973) is the 1958 edition (2001 reprint) of Carolan: The Life Times and Music of an Irish Harper. Partial lyrics (and all known sources of lyrics) are mentioned in the text description of each piece but are not matched to the written music. O'Sullivan does not include any of the handful of alleged Carolan songs that he considers to be erroneous, such as: "Dermott O'Doud", "Planxty Miss Burke", and "The Snowy-Breasted Pearl".

A comprehensive edition of Carolan's Songs & Airs containing new arrangements for harp of all 214 airs, along with an additional 12 airs from the Appendix of the 2001 edition was published by Caitríona Rowsome in 2011. This book includes an instance of each of Carolan's undisputed surviving lyrics and metrically sets the lyrics note-for-note to the sheet music airs. Each of the 226 harp settings in this book are played by the author on a neo-Irish harp (book and 4-CD set). This is the first time that all of Carolan's lyrics have been set to the airs and has been welcomed as "a task that has needed doing for many years". The 4-CD recording is of harp music without vocals, but the book includes sheet music for interested singers. The book also includes an English interpretation for each of Carolan's 72 Irish song lyrics. Five of these interpretations take the form of new English lyrics set metrically to the sheet music of "Hewlett", "Colonel John Irwin", "John O'Connor", "Kean O'Hara (3rd Air)" and "Sheebeg and Sheemore".

Performances
Since 1967, when Seán O’Riada and the Ceoltóirí Chualann released Carolan’s Concerto and 2 other Carolan compositions, there have been hundreds of recordings of Carolan songs released by dozens of artists. Many of these recordings are by such well-known performers as The Chieftains, Planxty, Patrick Ball, and Joemy Wilson, others by less well-known artists. Occasionally, an artist who is popular in another area will record a single Carolan song for the sake of variety, such as Steeleye Span's "Sheebeg and Sheemore", John Renbourn's "Lament for Owen Roe O'Neill", Richard Thompson's "Morgan Mawgan" [sic], Stefan Grossman's "Blind Mary", John Williams' "Mrs. Maxwell", and many others. Several popular collections by multiple artists have also been issued, including The Music of O’Carolan (1993), Deluxe Anthology of Carolan (1995), Celtic Treasure (1996), and Celtic Treasure II (2001). The sheer quantity of these recordings has greatly expanded the number of Carolan pieces known to the public, but the performers do tend to come back to certain songs again and again. Among the most frequently recorded pieces are the following:

"Carolan’s Concerto" (at least 35), "Blind Mary" (at least 23), "Planxty George Brabazon" (also known as "Isle of Skye"; at least 23), "Sheebeg and Sheemore" (at least 22), "Planxty Col. Irwin" (at least 19), "Fanny Power" (at least 19), "Eleanor Plunkett" (at least 18), "The Princess Royal" (also known as "Miss MacDermott" and "The Arethusa"; at least 18), "Carolan's Farewell to Music" (at least 18), "Carolan's Draught" (at least 17), "Hewlett" (at least 16), and "Stafford's Receipt" (at least 16). In addition, innumerable musicians have performed many of Carolan's tunes learned from such books as The Fiddler's Fakebook, which contains some of the above tunes plus Morgan Magan and Planxty Drury. Also, O'Neill’s Music of Ireland (1903) is still in print and contains over 60 of Carolan's tunes, of which far too many to list have made their way into the repertoire of musicians around the world.

In addition, Carolan's Concerto has been used as a neutral slow march by the Foot Guards of the British Army during the ceremony of Trooping the Colour. Also, some of Carolan's compositions have appeared in the role-playing game FATE, specifically Captain O'Kane and The Clergy's Lamentation.

Carolan's music has frequently been adapted for fingerstyle guitar (primarily steel-string acoustic), often by altering the tuning from standard (EADGBE) to DADGBE (drop D), DADGAD, and CGDGAD, among others. This allows strings to ring out and results in a more harp-like sound. Duck Baker has recorded many Carolan songs in drop D tuning. El McMeen performs almost exclusively in CGDGAD, and has recorded many Carolan songs.

Compositions
The complete list of the 214 Carolan compositions identified by Donal O'Sullivan (see References) are, in alphabetical order, as follows:

All Alive
Baptist Johnston
Betty MacNeill
Betty O'Brien
Blind Mary
Brian Maguire
Bridget Cruise, 1st Air
Bridget Cruise, 2nd Air
Bridget Cruise, 3rd Air
Bridget Cruise, 4th Air
Bumper Squire Jones
Captain Higgins
Captain Magan
Captain O'Kane
Captain O'Neill, (no. 214)
Captain Sudley (Carolan's Dowry)
Carolan's Cap
Carolan's Cottage
Carolan's Cup
Carolan's Draught
Carolan's Dream
Carolan's Farewell to Music
Carolan's Frolic
Carolan's Maggot
Carolan's Quarrel with the Landlady
Carolan's Ramble to Cashel
Carolan's Welcome, (no. 171)
Catherine Martin
Catherine O'More
Charles O'Conor
The Clergy's Lamentation
Colonel Irwin
Colonel Manus O'Donnell
Colonel O'Hara
Conor O'Reilly
Constantine Maguire
Counsellor Dillon
Cremonea
Daniel Kelly
The Dark, Plaintive Youth
David Power
Denis O'Conor, 1st Air
Denis O'Conor, 2nd Air
Dolly MacDonough (The Morning Star)
Donal O'Brien
Dr. John Hart
Dr. John Stafford (Stafford's Receipt)
Dr. MacMahon, Bishop of Clogher
Dr. Delany
Dr. John Hart, Bishop of Achonry
Dr. O'Connor
Edmond MacDermott Roe
Edward Corcoran
Edward Dodwell
Eleanor Plunkett
The Elevation
Elizabeth MacDermott Roe
Elizabeth Nugent
The Fairy Queen
Fanny Dillon
Fanny Power
Father Brian MacDermott Roe
Frank Palmer
General Wynne
George Brabazon, 1st Air
("Planxty") George Brabazon, 2nd Air
George Reynolds
Gerald Dillon
Grace Nugent
Henry MacDermott Roe, 1st Air
Henry MacDermott Roe, 2nd Air
Henry MacDermott Roe, 3rd Air
The Honourable Thomas Burke
Hugh Kelly
Hugh O'Donnell
Isabella Burke
James Betagh
James Crofton
James Daly
James Plunkett
John Drury, 1st Air
John Drury, 2nd Air
John Jameson
John Jones
John Kelly
John MacDermott
John Moore
John Nugent
John O'Connor
John O'Reilly, 1st Air
John O'Reilly, 2nd Air
John Peyton
Katherine O'More (The Hawk of the Erne)
Kean O'Hara, 1st Air (O'Hara's Cup)
Kean O'Hara, 2nd Air
Kean O'Hara, 3rd Air
Kitty Magennis
Lady Athenry
Lady Blaney
Lady Dillon
Lady Gethin
Lady Laetitia Burke
Lady St. John
Lady Wrixon
Lament for Charles MacCabe
Lament for Owen O'Rourke
Lament for Owen Roe O'Neill
Lament for Sir Ulick Burke
Lament for Terence MacDonough
The Landlady
Loftus Jones
Lord Dillon
Lord Galway's Lamentation
Lord Inchiquin
Lord Louth
Lord Massereene
Lord Mayo
Luke Dillon
Mabel Kelly
Major Shanly
Margaret Malone
Mary O'Neill
Maurice O'Connor, 1st Air
Maurice O'Connor, 2nd Air
Maurice O'Connor, 3rd Air
Mervyn Pratt
Michael O'Connor, 1st Air
Michael O'Connor, 2nd Air
Miss Crofton
Miss Fetherston (Carolan's Devotion)
Miss Goulding
Miss MacDermott (The Princess Royal)
Miss MacMurray
Miss Murphy
Miss Noble
Morgan Magan
Mr. Malone
Mr. O'Connor
Mr. Waller
Mrs. Anne MacDermott Roe
Mrs. Bermingham, 1st Air
Mrs. Bermingham, 2nd Air
Mrs. Cole
Mrs. Costello
Mrs. Crofton
Mrs. Delany
Mrs. Edwards
Mrs. Fallon
Mrs. Farrell
Mrs. Garvey, 1st Air
Mrs. Garvey, 2nd Air
Mrs. Harwood
Mrs. Judge
Mrs. Keel
Mrs. MacDermott Roe
Mrs. Maxwell, 1st Air
Mrs. Maxwell, 2nd Air
Mrs. Nugent
Mrs. O'Connor
Mrs. O'Conor
Mrs. O'Neill of Carlane
Mrs. O'Neill (Carolan's Favourite)
Mrs. O'Rourke
Mrs. Power (Carolan's Concerto)
Mrs. Sterling
Mrs. Waller
Nancy Cooper, 1st Air
Nancy Cooper, 2nd Air
O'Flinn
O'Reilly of Athcarne
The O'Rourkes' Feast
Ode to Whiskey
One Bottle More
Owen O'Rourke
Patrick Kelly
Peggy Morton
Planxty Browne, (no. 180)
Planxty Burke
Planxty Crilly
Planxty Drew
Planxty Hewlett
Planxty John Irwin
Planxty Kelly
Planxty O'Rourke, 1st Air
Planxty O'Rourke, 2nd Air
Planxty Plunkett
Planxty Sweeney
Planxty Wilkinson
Richard Cusack
Robert Hawkes
Robert Jordan
The Seas are Deep
Separation of Soul and Body
Sheebeg and Sheemore
Sir Arthur Shaen
Sir Charles Coote
Sir Edward Crofton
Sir Festus Burke
Sir Ulick Burke
Squire Parsons
Squire Wood's Lamentation on the Refusal of his Halfpence
Susanna Kelly
Thomas Burke
Thomas Judge (Carolan's Frolic)
Tobias Peyton
The Two William Davises
(unnamed) - 8 pieces, (nos. 172-179)
Variations on the Scottish Air"Cock Up Your Beaver"
Variations on the Scottish Air"When She Cam Ben"
William Eccles
William Ward

Many of these pieces have alternative titles, as fully documented by Donal O'Sullivan. O'Sullivan's preferred titles are the ones generally accepted as standard, though quite a few of these titles were devised by O'Sullivan himself after exhaustive research into the identities of the patrons for whom each song was written.

Additionally, a manuscript compiled in Scotland in 1816 by the MacLean-Clephane sisters was discovered in 1983 and includes at least five other pieces credited to Carolan and other annotated pieces that were "improved by Carolan" or "consistent with Carolan's writing to warrant consideration". These airs are included in the Appendix of the 2001 edition of Carolan: The Life Times and Music of an Irish Harper along with detailed research notes. These pieces came to light a decade after the death of Donal O'Sullivan in 1973, so he never had an opportunity to subject them to the same analysis that he used on the original 214 airs that he originally compiled in 1958. However, to date, no one has disputed the attributions presented in this manuscript. Newly composed harp arrangements for each of these and all the other airs (as well as new Carolan repertoire numbers 215 to 226 for each of the MacLean-Clephane tunes) are included in The Complete Carolan Songs & Airs by Caitríona Rowsome. The five pieces that are said to be composed by Carolan rather than simply "improved" are:
"Athlone" (215)
"Banks of the Shannon" (216)
"Farewell to Lough Neaghe" (219)
"Irish Galloway Tom" (220)
"The Lamentation of Ireland" (221)

Other

O'Carolan Road in the Tenters area of Dublin 8 is named in his honour.
Carolan Road and "Carolan Corner" shop are named in his honour in the Ballynafeigh area of south Belfast.
The meteorite crater Carolan on Mercury was named in his honour in 2015.
Polish bands: 2 plus 1 in 1979 and Myslovitz in 1996 recorded songs entitled "Peggy Brown", said to be a translation of an obscure O'Carolan lyric by Polish lyricist Ernest Bryll, with different tunes and arrangements: folk and alternative rock, respectively. Neither of these tunes use an O'Carolan composition. Both songs were very popular in Poland.
O'Carolan is depicted on the £50 note, Series B Banknote of Ireland.

See also
List of people on the postage stamps of Ireland
Music of Ireland

Notes

References

Bibliography
 Laurence Whyte: "A Dissertation on Italian and Irish Musick, with Some Panegyrick on Carrallan Our Late Irish Orpheus", in Poems on Various Subjects (Dublin, 1740).
 Oliver Goldsmith: "The History of Carolan, the Last Irish Harper", in The British Magazine, or Monthly Repository for Gentlemen and Ladies, vol. 1 no. 7 (July 1760), pp. 418–419.
 Joseph Cooper Walker: Historical Memoirs of the Irish Bards (Dublin, 1786).
 (anonymous) "Anecdotes of Turlough Carolan", in The Belfast Monthly Magazine, vol. 3 no. 12 (1809), pp. 42–46.
 Luke Donnellan: "Carolaniana", in Journal of the County Louth Archaeological Society, vol. 2 no. 1 (1908), p. 62–71.
 Tomás Ó Máille (ed.): Amhráin Chearbhalláin/The Poems of Carolan: Together with Other N. Connacht and S. Ulster Lyrics (London, 1916).
 Donal O'Sullivan: Carolan: The Life Times and Music of an Irish Harper, 2 volumes (London: Routledge and Kegan Paul, 1958); new edition in 1 volume: Cork: Ossian Publications, 2001;  (hardback), 1-900428-71-7 (paperback).
 Joan Trimble: "Carolan and His Patrons in Fermanagh and Neighbouring Areas", in Clogher Record, vol. 10 no. 1 (1979), pp. 26–50.
 Gráinne Yeats: "Lost Chords", in: Ceol, vol. 7 no. 1–2 (1984), pp. 14–19.
 The Complete Works of O'Carolan: Irish Harper & Composer (1670–1738), edition of the music, reprinted from O'Sullivan (1958) (Cork: Ossian Publications, 1984), .
 Joan Rimmer: "Patronage, Style and Structure in the Music Attributed to Turlough Carolan", in Early Music, vol. 15 no. 2 (1987), pp. 164–174.
 Harry White: "Carolan and the Dislocation of Music in Ireland", in: Eighteenth-Century Ireland, vol. 4 (1989), pp. 55–64.
 Joan Rimmer: "Harp Repertoire in Eighteenth-Century Ireland: Perceptions, Misconceptions and Reworkings", in Martin van Scheik (ed.): Aspects of the Historical Harp. Proceedings of the International Historical Harps Symposium, Utrecht 1992 (Utrecht: STIMU Foundation for Historical Performance Practice, 1994), pp. 73–85.
 Sandra Joyce: "An Introduction to O'Carolan's Music in Eighteenth-Century Printed Collections", in Patrick Devine and Harry White (eds), The Maynooth International Musicological Conference, 1995: Selected Proceedings, Part 1 (= Irish Musical Studies, vol. 4) (Dublin: Four Courts Press, 1996), pp. 296–309.
 Art Edelstein: Fair Melodies: Turlough Carolan, An Irish Harper (East Calais, Vermont: Noble Stone Press, 2001), .
 Caitríona Rowsome: The Complete Carolan Songs & Airs (Dublin: Waltons Publishing, 2011), .
 Sandra Joyce: "Carolan, Turlough [Toirdhealbhach Ó Cearbhalláin]", in: Harry White & Barra Boydell (eds), The Encyclopaedia of Music in Ireland'' (Dublin: University College Dublin Press, 2013), pp. 162–164.

External links
Recording of O'Carolan's tunes by "Garlic Bread" and French baroque ensemble "Le concert de l'Hostel Dieu" 
The Complete Carolan: many of Carolan's tunes, arranged in open tunings for the guitar
O'Carolan: pages on his life, his tunes, his songs, his harp, with audio files
Nikolaus Newerkla, Playford Dances & Carolan Tunes, Moeck-Verlag Celle, 2007, tunes arranged for recorders and basso continuo, The Music of an Irish Harper, Bärenreiter-Verlag Kassel, 2012, tunes arranged for recorders and harpsichord (piano).
Turlough O'Carolan: Irish Harper
Turlough O'Carolan 1670-1738
Complete Works of Turlough O'Carolan (musical scores)
Carolan Fragment: one of the early sources described
Gaelic harp keys (web article with suggested original keys of all O'Carolan's tunes)

The first complete recording of the Complete Works of O'Carolan has been recorded and arranged by Irish pianist, J.J. Sheridan

The first complete recording on an Irish Harp of "The Complete Carolan Songs & Airs" has been recorded and arranged by Irish Harpist, Caitríona Rowsome, 2011

1670 births
1738 deaths
17th-century Irish people
18th-century Irish people
Irish Baroque composers
Composers for harp
Irish composers
Irish harpists
Irish blind people
Musicians from County Meath
People from Mohill
Musicians from County Leitrim